Noz'hat al-Majāles ( "Joy of the Gatherings/Assemblies") is an anthology which contains around 4,100 Persian quatrains by some 300 poets of the 5th to 7th centuries AH (11th to 13th centuries AD). The anthology was compiled around the middle of the 7th century AH (13th century) by the Persian poet Jamal al-Din Khalil Shirvani. Jamal al-Din Khalil Shirvani compiled his anthology in the name of 'Ala al-Din Shirvanshah Fariburz III (r. 1225-51), son of Garshasp. The book was dedicated to Fariburz III.

Book
The book is arranged by subject in 17 chapters divided into 96 different sections. The anthology also includes 179 quatrains and an ode (qasida) of 50 distiches written by Jamal Khalil Shirvani himself. The book is preserved in a unique manuscript copied by Esmail b. Esfandiyar b. Mohammad b. Esfandiar Abhari on July 31, 1331.

A significant importance of Nozhat al-Majales is that it contains quatrains from poet whose collected works are no longer extant. For example, it contains thirty-three quatrains by Omar Khayyam and sixty quatrains by Mahsati. These are among the oldest and most reliable collections of their works. Nozhat al-Majales also contains quatrains from such scholars and mystics as Avicenna, Attar of Nishapur, Sanai, Afdal al-Din Kashani, Ahmad Ghazali (the mystic brother of al-Ghazali), Majd al-Din Baghdadi (a major figure of traditional Sufism born in Baghdadak in Great Khorasan) and Ahmad Jam, who had never been recognized as major poets. It also contains quatrains from writers and poets who are not known for their quatrains such as Asadi Tusi, Nizami Ganjavi, Fakhruddin As'ad Gurgani and Qabus. Some quatrains are even narrated from statements and rulers such as Fariburz III Shirvanshah, the Seljuq Sultan Tugrul and Shams ad-Din Juvayni.

Persian language and culture in the Caucasus regions
The most significant merit of Nozhat al-Majales, as regards to the history of Persian literature, is that it embraces the works of some 115 poets from the northwestern Iran and Eastern Transcaucasia (Arran, Sharvan, Azerbaijan; including 24 poets from Ganja alone), where, due to the change of language, the heritage of Persian literature in that region has almost entirely vanished.  The fact that numerous quatrains of some poets from the region (e.g. Aziz Shirwani, Shams Sojasi, Amir Najib al-Din Omar of Ganjda, Kamal Maraghi, Borhan Ganjai, Eliyas Ganjai, Bakhtiar Shirwani) are mentioned in a series shows that the editor possessed their collected works.

Unlike other parts of Persia, were the poets were attached to courts, or belonged to higher ranks of society such as scholars, bureaucrats, and secretaries, a good number of poets from the Eastern Transcaucasian regions rose among working-class people. They frequently use colloquial expression in their poetry. They are referred to as water carriers (Saqqa'), Sparrow dealers, bodyguard (jandar), saddlers, blanket makers (Lehafi), etc. Some of these poets were also female such as Dokhatri-i Khatib Ganjeh, Dokhtar-i Salar, Dokhtar-i Sati, Mahsati Ganjavi, Dokhtar-i Hakim Kaw, Razziya Ganjai.  This fact that many female poets and everyday people not connected to courts have composed quatrains illustrates the overall use of Persian in that region before its gradual linguistic Turkification.

On Mohammad ibn Ba'ith:
صفحه 18:
اما نباید این تصور را پیش آورد که سخن فارسی همراه سلجوقیان در آذربایجان و آران راه گشود.  برعکس ، این را خوب میدانیم که شمال غرب ایران از آغاز همیشه پایگاه فرهنگ والای ایرانی بوده است، و پیش از آنکه محمد بن وصیف سگزی (نخستینه شاعر شناخهء ایران) در سیستان سرودن قصیده را آغاز کند، به گفتهء طبری پیران مراغه اشعار فارسی (یعنی فهلوی) محمد بن بعیث بن حلبس فرمانروای مرند (متوقی 235) را میخوانده‌‌اند.  حلبس پدر بزرگ این مرد، خود از مهاجران تازی نجد و حجاز بود، و شعر فارسی گفتن نوه‌اش به سبب انس با محیط فرهنگ محلی بود.
Translation:
Pg 18:
One should not erroneously claim that the Seljuqs brought Persian into Arran and Azerbaijan.  Opposite to this idea, we know well that the North West has always been a rich center for Iranian culture.  Even before Muhammad ibn Wasif Sagrzi (the first known poet of Iran) who composed in the Qasida form  in Sistan, Tabari has mentioned that the elders of Maragha read the Persian Fahlavi vernacular) poetry of Mohammad ibn Ba'ith ibn Halbas, the ruler of Marand.  Halbas, which was his grandfather, was himself a recent Arabian migrant from the lands of Najd and Hijaz, and the Persian poetry of his grandson was due to his accurlation in the local culture.

Pg 20 on USSR writers again:
بنابراین ادعای سیاست پیشگان شوروی و جاهلانی که طوطی-وار حرفهای آنها را تکرار میکنند درست نیست، و وجود اینهمه شاعران فارسی‌گوی در قفقاز و آران تحت تأثیر فرامانروایان ایرانی آن سرزمین نبوده، بلکه درست برعکس این ادعای غرض آلود، زبان و فرهنگ بومیان آن دیار بود که فرمانروایان بیگانه را با فرهنگ ایرانی خوگرفت
Translation of Page 20:
“Thus the theory of politicized Soviet authors and those that ignorantly repeated them are not correct, and multitude of numbers of Persian poets from Caucasus and Arran was not due to the Iranian and Iranicized rulers of the area, but in opposite to this politicized theory, it was the language and culture of the people which Iranicized the rulers”

Pg 25-27 is devoted on Arranian Style (Sabk-e-Arrani):
برخی پژوهندگان دیگر هم بدون توجه به شیوه‌ی سخن و نوع مضمون و خیال، تنها مناسبت زمانی را در نظرگرفته سخنسرایان آن دیار را جزو "شعر

References

Poetry anthologies
Persian literature
Persian poetry
Medieval Iranian Azerbaijan
Medieval Azerbaijan